The 1987 Ecuador earthquakes occurred over a six-hour period on March 6. The sequence of shocks measured 6.7, 7.1, and 6.0 on the moment magnitude scale. The main shock had a maximum Mercalli intensity of IX (Violent). The earthquakes were centered in Napo Province in northeast Ecuador; the epicenters were on the eastern slopes of the Andes, about 75 km ENE of Quito and 25 km north of Reventador Volcano. The earthquakes caused about 1,000 deaths. Four thousand were missing and an estimated US$1 billion in damage was caused.

See also 
 Mass wasting

References

Sources

External links
Officials Fear Quake Killed 300 in Ecuador – Los Angeles Times
300 reported dead and 4,000 missing in Ecuador quakes – The New York Times

Earthquakes in Ecuador
Ecuador
Earthquakes
Napo Province
March 1987 events in South America
1987 disasters in Ecuador